General elections were held in Mexico in 1884. The result of the presidential election was a victory for Porfirio Díaz, who received 98.8% of the vote.

Results

President

References

Mexico
General
Presidential elections in Mexico
Election and referendum articles with incomplete results